Irugaiyur is a village in the Udayarpalayam taluk of Ariyalur district, Tamil Nadu, India.

Irugaiyur place village panchayat in account of T. Palur block.
There are containing four villages, 1.irugaiyur.2.Venanullur.3.kottiyal.4.kuzhadukuppam.
Kottiyal village have present in only one community of people. This village noted eight types of orgine community.it will be appear on kumpakonam to ariyalur main road. Now this way very economic in our district. From kottiyal to kumpakonam just 45 mins travel.

Demographics 

As per the 2001 census, Irugaiyur had a total population of 3368 with 1637 males and 1731 females.

References 

Villages in Ariyalur district